Subrahmanya Road is a railway station on Mangalore–Hassan–Mysore line. It is located in Dakshina Kannada district, Karnataka state, India. The station consists of three platforms, which are not well sheltered.

Location 
Subrahmanya Road railway station serves Subramanya village in Dakshina Kannada district. It belongs to Mysore railway division, part of South Western Railway zone of Indian Railways.

Services 
There are several trains to Mysore, Kannur, Bengaluru, Vijayapura, Yesvantpur and Mangalore that stop at Subrahmanya Road station:

References 

Railway stations in Dakshina Kannada district
Mysore railway division